It's (or It Is) Good to Be Alive may refer to:

Music 
 It's Good to Be Alive (album), an album by D. J. Rogers
 "It's Good to Be Alive", a song by D. J. Rogers
 It's Good to Be Alive, an album by Michael Saxell
 "It's Good to Be Alive", a song from an album Manfred Mann Chapter Three Volume Two by Manfred Mann Chapter Three
 "It's Good to Be Alive", a 1957 song written by Bob Merrill
 "It's Good to Be Alive", a song from the theatrical musical New Girl in Town
 "It's Good to Be Alive", a song from the theatrical musical Desperate Measures (musical)
 "Tänk va' skönt", a Swedish version of "It's Good To Be Alive", from album Som jag är by Agnetha Fältskog

Other uses 
 It's Good to Be Alive (book), by Roy Campanella
 It's Good to Be Alive (film), a television film adaptation of the book
 Dis Lekker om te Lewe, also known as It's Good to Be Alive, a South African film, starring Al Debbo

See also 

 It's Great to Be Alive (disambiguation)
 Good to Be Alive (disambiguation)